Pterotaea lamiaria is a species of geometrid moth in the family Geometridae. It is found in North America.

The MONA or Hodges number for Pterotaea lamiaria is 6553.

Subspecies
These two subspecies belong to the species Pterotaea lamiaria:
 Pterotaea lamiaria lamiaria
 Pterotaea lamiaria tytthos Rindge, 1970

References

Further reading

 

Boarmiini
Articles created by Qbugbot
Moths described in 1899